Andreas Strobel (born 13 May 1972) is a German ski mountaineer and marathon mountain biker.

Strobel was born in Selb, and started bike sports as condition training in 1991. After bad results at the "Ronda Extrema" race in Riva del Garda in 1997, he intensified the training. He is also member of the national ski mountaineering team.

Selected results

Ski mountaineering 
 2006:
 4th, German Championship single
 2005:
 2nd, German Championship vertical race
 2007:
 2nd, Dammkarwurm race
 2008:
 1st, German Championship vertical race
 3rd, German Championship single
 3rd, German Championship team
 6th, World Championship relay race (together with Toni Steurer, Stefan Klinger and Konrad Lex)
 2009:
 2nd, German Championship vertical race
 9th, European Championship relay race (together with Toni Steurer, Konrad Lex and Alexander Schuster)
 2010:
 9th, World Championship relay race (together with Martin Echtler, Konrad Lex and Alexander Schuster)

Mountain biking 
 2003:
 1st, Transrockies race
 3rd, Transalpchallenge
 2004:
 1st, Bavarian Championship
 1st, MV-Marathon serie
 2nd, Cape Epic race
 3rd, German Championship of bike marathon
 2005:
 1st, Transcreta race
 2006:
 1st, Bavarian Championship
 1st, Ritchey MTB Challenge

References

External links 
 Andreas Strobel at skimountaineering.com
 Videointerview (German), Dammkarwurm 2007

1972 births
Living people
German male ski mountaineers
German male cyclists
People from Wunsiedel (district)
Sportspeople from Upper Franconia
Marathon mountain bikers
Cape Epic cyclists
German mountain bikers
Cyclists from Bavaria